The women's 3000 metres at the 2011 World Youth Championships in Athletics was held at the Stadium Nord Lille Métropole on 6 July.

Medalists

Results

Intermediate leaders:
1000 m:  Tomoka Kimura: 2:58.83 
2000 m:  Alemitu Heroye: 6:05.35

References 

2011 World Youth Championships in Athletics